December 2017

References

 12
December 2017 events in the United States